Nick Watt is a Los Angeles, California based reporter for CNN, and an occasional anchor on CNN International. Prior to joining CNN in 2018, he was a producer and then a correspondent with ABC News for 20 years. He also hosted Watts World on the Travel Channel. He is Scottish. Watt has won two Emmy Awards, one for his reporting from Fallujah, Iraq in 2004, and another as a producer for work in Darfur, Sudan. He is also the voice of Zito the elephant in the Disney series The Lion Guard.

Early life

Watt was born in Paisley, Scotland. He grew up in the Scottish Borders, Thailand, Malaysia, Turkey and South Africa. He has a master's degree in Modern History from the University of St. Andrews in Scotland with a focus on post-war U.S. foreign policy.

Career

Watt began his career as a reporter for the Southampton Press newspaper from 1995 until 1997.

Watt started at ABC's London bureau in 1997 as a desk assistant and tape librarian. He spent 15 years based in London covering stories across the world, including wars in Iraq, Afghanistan and Liberia along with the odd royal wedding. He moved to Los Angeles with ABC News in 2012, before moving to CNN in 2018.

Personal life

Watt lives in Santa Monica. He is married with children. His wife was born in South Africa. His hobbies include cricket and rugby.

References

External links
Profile at IMDb with a list of programs he's been in
Video clips of Watt at TV Guide

Year of birth missing (living people)
Living people
Place of birth missing (living people)
CNN people
American television reporters and correspondents
Scottish expatriates in the United States
News & Documentary Emmy Award winners
Scottish television journalists
People from Jedburgh
Alumni of the University of St Andrews
ABC News personalities